The Inter-Provincial Championship is a three-day cricket tournament in Ireland, played between regional teams drawn from three of Ireland's five provincial unions. It parallels first-class cricket tournaments in other countries such as the County Championship of England and the Sheffield Shield of Australia. The tournament was held for the first time in 2013 across venues in Ireland.

Up to and including the 2016 tournament, the matches were not given first-class status. However, at an International Cricket Council (ICC) meeting in October 2016, first-class status was awarded to all future matches, starting with the 2017 tournament.

History

Background
The Ireland cricket team have had huge success recently on the international level which has boosted the popularity of the game in the country. They had earned the reputation of a giant killer after upsetting teams like Pakistan and Bangladesh (2007 Cricket World Cup), and England (2011 Cricket World Cup). Their good performances in major international tournaments meant that Cricket Ireland openly started bidding for Test match status to the International Cricket Council. Nevertheless, one of the main stumbling road blocks for Ireland from getting to play the pinnacle of the game was a lack of a first-class cricket infrastructure at home, amongst other things. As early as August 2011, Cricket Ireland announced plans of a domestic first-class tournament. In January 2012, Cricket Ireland announced the ambitious 'Vision 2020' plan which announced the establishment of a first-class structure by 2015 and achievement of Test status by 2020. It also began work on a cricket academy to find talented players across the country and improving grass-roots cricket in the country. For the first time professional contacts, with central, A, B, and C were established. Plans for Test status were established partly to stem the flow of their star cricketers moving away to England in hope of playing Test cricket such as Ed Joyce, Eoin Morgan and Boyd Rankin. According to Richard Holdsworth in an interview with Setanta Sports, CI are pleased with the strategic progress that had been made as of November 2012. In December 2012, Ireland got a $1.5m boost as increased funding from the ICC to establish elite domestic competitions in the country.

Format
The tournament is played in a double round-robin format, with each team playing each other twice, once at home and once away.

Points summary
Points are scored as follows:

 Win – 16 points
 Draw – 3 points
 Tie – 8 points
 Batting bonus points – 1 point for scoring 150, 200, 250 and 300 runs
 Bowling bonus points – 1 points for taking 3, 5, 7 and 9 wickets
 Bonus points only apply for the first 100 overs of each team's first innings
 Over rate penalties also apply on a match by match basis for teams who fail to bowl their overs at the required rate

Teams
Three of Ireland's five cricket unions take part in the Inter-Provincial Series; Munster Cricket Union and Connacht Cricket Union do not participate.

In the six years of its existence, the competition has been dominated by Leinster Lightning, winning the first five titles, including the 2017 competition, the first one treated as a first-class competition. In 2018, North West Warriors finally broke the Leinster stranglehold, winning their first Championship. In July 2020, Danish cricketer Freddie Klokker suggested that a European XI team could play in the competition, to give more experience to European cricketers playing in the longer format of the game.

Competition placings

2013 to present

All-time records
(All records correct to end of 2018 season)

Team records

Highest innings totals
First Class cricket only

Lowest completed innings totals

Highest scores in the fourth innings of the match

Individual records – batting

Most career runs
First Class cricket only

Highest individual scores

Most runs scored in a season
 First Class cricket only

Individual records – bowling

Most career wickets
First Class cricket only

Best bowling in an innings

Most wickets in a season
First Class cricket only

Partnership records

Highest partnerships for each wicket

Seasons
2013 Inter-Provincial Championship
2014 Inter-Provincial Championship
2015 Inter-Provincial Championship
2016 Inter-Provincial Championship

First Class status granted in 2017

2017 Inter-Provincial Championship
2018 Inter-Provincial Championship
 2019 Inter-Provincial Championship

See also

Cricket in Ireland
History of cricket
Inter-Provincial Cup
Inter-Provincial Trophy
Inter-Provincial T20 Festival

References

External links
-official website

 
Irish domestic cricket competitions
First-class cricket competitions